The initials BRA may refer to:

Military 
 Bougainville Revolutionary Army, a Papua New Guinea revolutionary army
 Brigadier, Royal Artillery, in a Commonwealth army division

Organizations 
 Boston Redevelopment Authority, an American planning agency
 BRA Transportes Aéreos, a former Brazilian airline
 BRA Braathens Regional Airlines, a Swedish airline 
 British Records Association, for historic records and archives
 Brå, Brottsförebyggande rådet, the Swedish National Council for Crime Prevention

Places 
 Brazil (ISO 3166-1 alpha-3 code)
 Barreiras Airport (IATA code), in Brazil
 Union Station (Brattleboro, Vermont), US, Amtrak station code

Other uses 
 Belfast Royal Academy, Northern Ireland, a school 
 Bentley Rhythm Ace, an English band
 Bilateral renal agenesis, a fetal medical condition
 Braj Bhasha language (ISO 639-2 and ISO 639-3 codes)
 Breast Reconstruction Awareness Day or No Bra Day

See also
 Bra (disambiguation)